Painted Desert may refer to:

Geography
 Painted Desert (Arizona), an area of badlands in the southwestern United States
Painted Desert Inn, a lodge at the Petrified Forest National Park
 Painted Desert (South Australia), a mountainous area in south-central Australia
 Painted Desert, a neighborhood in Las Vegas, Nevada, US

Art, entertainment, and media

Film 
The Painted Desert, a 1931 film starring Clark Gable
Painted Desert (1938 film), a 1938 remake starring George O'Brien and Laraine Day
Painted Desert, a 1993 film featuring Don Keith Opper

Music

Painted Desert, a movement in the Grand Canyon Suite by Ferde Grofé
The Painted Desert, a 2004 album by the Barrett Martin Group
The Painted Desert, a 2005 composition for brass band by Philip Sparke

Songs
"Painted Desert", a song on the 1970 album The Price You Got to Pay to Be Free by Cannonball Adderley
"The Painted Desert", a 1985 single by Pat Benatar from her 1984 album Tropico
"The Painted Desert", a song by 10,000 Maniacs from their 1987 album In My Tribe

Other uses
Arizona elegans philipi, commonly known as the Painted Desert glossy snake

See also
Red Desert (disambiguation)